An importation right is the legal ability to import a product into a certain country.

Importation means "sending goods from one country to another".  Right means "in accord with law...."

See also
 Import duty
 Most favored nation

References

International law
Import